Connor Robert Long is an American (Maryland-born (July 1994), but Colorado-based) advocate, athlete, actor and speaker.

His acting credits include stage, screen, live action and television.

He is a founding player in the Tapestry Theatre Company, an inclusive all-abilities troupe in Boulder County, Colorado.  His film projects, both short and feature, have played festivals around the world and include a premiere at Sundance. He studied with the Colorado Shakespeare Festival School of Theatre.  His acclaimed performances resulted in best actor nominations and a win in the Filmstock Film Festival Utah for his work in Menschen. and the Prix D'Interpretation (BestActor) at the International Festival Entr'2 Marches in Cannes, France, for his lead role in the short film, Learning to Drive.  He is a 2017 Heartlands Region Emmy-winning contributing reporter for Denver7News (KMGH-ABC) in Denver, Colorado. In November 2018, he was a sponsored guest of the US Embassy-Moscow Speaker Program for the Breaking Down Barriers 9th International Disability Film Festival, at which he received the festival Best Actor (male) award.. He appeared in the 2016 comedy film Wiener-Dog as Tommy.

He has been recognized by national and international organizations for his advocacy on behalf of  people with differing abilities, whether physical or intellectual. He has received awards and recognition from the National Down Syndrome Society, the Council for Exceptional Children, the Global Down Syndrome Foundation, the John Lynch Foundation and the Anna & John J. Sie Foundation, and The Arc of the United States.  In 2018, he participated in the “Channel Kindness” year-long social-media reporting program established by Lady Gaga’s Born This Way Foundation.

As an athlete, he has achievements in high school (lettered twice) and Special Olympic competitive swimming. After learning to ride at age 16, he now cycles to raise funds for medical research and clinical care for Trisomy 21 (Down Syndrome) and related conditions.  He enjoys rock climbing & taekwondo (has a black belt).

References

Further reading
 

Year of birth missing (living people)
Living people
American male actors
American male journalists